Major General Lena Maria Persson Herlitz née Persson (born 12 August 1967) is a Swedish Amphibious Corps officer. She currently serves as Chief of Policy and Plans Department at the Swedish Armed Forces Headquarters in Stockholm.

Career
Persson Herlitz began her military career in Älvsborg Coastal Artillery Regiment (KA 4) in Gothenburg in 1991. In 1989, all positions within the Swedish Armed Forces were opened for women, and the military interest in combination with the search for a challenge made her enlist in 1991. She came to serve in a mobile barrier company. In 1993-1994, she attended officer training at the Swedish Navy Officers’ College (Marinens officershögskola, MOHS). From 1995 to 1996 she was placed in the 5th Amphibious Battalion as an instructor for command and communication systems. From 1997 to 1998 Persson Herlitz served in the Swedish battalion BA09 in Bosnia and Herzegovina. There she served as deputy chief of staff platoon; also driver and gunner of a 12.7 mm machine gun with one of the platoon's Patria Pasi armoured personnel carriers. Back in Sweden, she served as platoon commander in the 5th Amphibious Battalion. In 2000, she became an adjutant to the regimental commander of Amf 4, Colonel Bo Andersson, and later, after completing staff training at the Swedish National Defence College, became company commander of the 5th Amphibious Battalion during the years 2003–2004. Amf 4 was disbanded in connection with the Defense Act of 2004 and Persson Herlitz was offered a job in Stockholm and attended the management program at the Swedish National Defence College in the years 2004-2006, which was a prerequisite for becoming a lieutenant colonel.

In 2006, she was offered a position at the Swedish Military Intelligence and Security Service (MUST) and initially became an analyst specializing in the Democratic Republic of the Congo. From August 2007 to April 2008, she served as head of the Swedish National Intelligence Cell in Kabul, Afghanistan. Back in Sweden, she returned to MUST as head of the Afghanistan Desk and then also had to take responsibility for the entire Asia section May 2008. She served in this position until December 2009. From 2008, Persson Herlitz served one month a year as Aide-de-camp to Victoria, Crown Princess of Sweden. In January 2010, Persson Herlitz was appointed commander of KS21, the Swedish contingent within Kosovo Force (KFOR) in Kosovo. She served there until October 2010, and in November the same year she was appointed head of M3 PLANS, Deputy Chief of Staff within the Maritime Component Command at the Swedish Armed Forces Headquarters in Stockholm. In March 2012, Persson Herlitz was deployed again to Afghanistan, this time as military advisor for the United Nations Assistance Mission in Afghanistan (UNAMA) in Kabul. She left this position in December the same year. During this time, she also served as contingent commander team leader for the Afghan National Security Forces.

Upon her return to Sweden, on 1 January 2013, Persson Herlitz took command over the Swedish Armed Forces International Centre (SWEDINT). SWEDINT is the Swedish Armed Forces' competence centers for integrated multinational staff training. During this time, SWEDINT became the first training center in the world to become NATO certified. Persson Herlitz was then appointed  military adviser at the Ministry of Defence's Unit for Military Capability and Operations (MFI), serving there from October 2014 to March 2017. In April 2017, Persson Herlitz assumed the position of head of Training Department in the Training & Procurement Staff at the Swedish Armed Forces Headquarters. On 1 February 2019, Persson Herlitz was appointed Deputy Chief of Policy and Plans Department in the Defence Staff and promoted to Brigadier General. There she worked mainly with issues with defence planning and international cooperation. She also served as military strategic operations commander. On 13 August 2020, the Supreme Commander of the Swedish Armed Forces appointed Persson Herlitz to Chief of Policy and Plans Department. She took up her new post on 10 September 2020 and was promoted to Major General in connection with this. She is also part of the Defence Board (Försvarsmaktsledningen, FML). She was succeeded on the Deputy Chief of Policy and Plans Department post by Brigadier General Johan Pekkari.

Dates of rank
19?? – Second lieutenant
19?? – Lieutenant
19?? – Captain
19?? – Major
20?? – Lieutenant colonel
2013 – Colonel
2019 – Brigadier general
2020 – Major general

Awards and decorations

Swedish
   For Zealous and Devoted Service of the Realm
   King Carl XVI Gustaf's Jubilee Commemorative Medal II (23 August 2013)
   H. M. The King's Medal, 8th size gold (silver-gilt) medal worn on the chest suspended by the Order of the Seraphim ribbon (2014)
   Crown Princess Victoria and Prince Daniel's Wedding Commemorative Medal (8 June 2010)
   Swedish Armed Forces Conscript Medal
   Swedish Armed Forces International Service Medal
   Life Guards Medal of Merit III in silver
   4th Marine Regiment Commemorative Medal (Älvsborgs amfibieregementes minnesmedalj, ÄlvsbamfregMSM)

Foreign
   NATO medal for the former Yugoslavia
   NATO Non-Article 5 medal for ISAF
   NATO Non-Article 5 medal for the Balkans
  Medal of Honor of the Army of the Czech Republic

References

1967 births
Living people
Swedish Amphibious Corps generals
Female generals and flag officers of Sweden